is a passenger railway station located in the city of Susaki, Kōchi Prefecture, Japan. It is operated by JR Shikoku and has the station number "K18".

Lines

Layout
The station consists of a side platform serving a single track. There is no station building, only a weather shelter on the platform for waiting passengers. A ramp leads up to the platform from the access road. A bike shed is provided near the station.

Adjacent stations

History
The station opened on 1 October 1960 as a new stop on the existing Dosan Line. At this time the station was operated by Japanese National Railways (JNR). With the privatization of JNR on 1 April 1987, control of the station passed to JR Shikoku.

Surrounding area
Japan National Route 56

See also
 List of Railway Stations in Japan

References

External links

 JR Shikoku timetable

Railway stations in Kōchi Prefecture
Railway stations in Japan opened in 1960
Susaki, Kōchi